The Committee on Capital Markets Regulation is an independent and nonpartisan 501(c)(3) research organization financed by contributions from individuals, foundations, and corporations.

Background
Thirty-six leaders from the financial sector, including banks, broker-dealers, asset managers, private funds, insurance companies, and academia comprise the committee's membership. The committee co-chairs are Glenn Hubbard, dean of Columbia Business School, and John L. Thornton, chairman of the Brookings Institution.  The committee's director is Professor Hal S. Scott, Emeritus Nomura Professor and director of the Program on International Financial Systems at Harvard Law School. The committee's research regarding the regulation of U.S. capital markets provides policymakers with a nonpartisan, empirical foundation for public policy.

History
The committee was founded in 2006 by then-Secretary of the Treasury, Henry Paulson.

Past recommendations

The global Financial Crisis: A Plan for Regulatory Reform
In 2009, the Committee determined four critical objectives based upon a year of observation and research into the financial crisis that are further broken down into 57 specific recommendations.  These four objectives are:
  Reduced systemic risk through more sensible and effective regulation.
  Increased disclosure to protect investors and stabilize the market.
  A unified regulatory system where lines of accountability are clear and transparency in improved.
  International regulatory harmonization and cooperation.

A Blueprint for Financial Reform
In 2010, within a 37-page letter to Chairman Dodd, Ranking Member Shelby, Chairman Lincoln and Ranking Member Chambliss, the CCMR evaluated all major elements in the financial reform proposals that have emerged from Senate committees, but focused especially on four as areas for compromise:
 Federal regulators must have the ability to use tax dollars (and recoup them later) to pay for the orderly resolution of failing institutions in cases where they judge the alternative would be national and/or international financial catastrophe.
 No banks or non-banks should be labeled “systemically important.”
 Clarity about jurisdiction over the clearing and settlement of derivatives is crucial to reducing systemic risk, as is increasing these activities.
 The proposed independent and transparently funded Consumer Financial Protection Bureau (CFPB) should be free of overriding authority except that of the Financial Stability Oversight Council (as provided in the Dodd Bill) and the Treasury Secretary (only when he or she is acting on matters of the “safety and soundness” of the financial system, as in matters of systemic risk).

A Balanced Approach to Cost-Benefit Analysis Reform
Released in October 2013, the committee's position paper set forth a balanced approach to strengthening cost-benefit analysis requirements applicable to the independent agencies tasked with implementing regulatory reform in the U.S. financial system. The Committee outlined an approach it believed would maximize the economic efficiency of the U.S. regulatory system, minimize procedural burdens on regulators, and help insulate new rulemakings from judicial challenge.

The U.S. Equity Markets: A Plan for Regulatory Reform
In July 2016, the committee's “The U.S. Equity Markets: A Plan for Regulatory Reform” sought to inform the public and policymakers about the U.S. equity market structure and evaluate its performance for U.S. investors and public companies. The report set forth 24 recommendations that fell into three categories:
 Increasing the transparency of U.S. equity markets
 Strengthening the resilience of U.S. equity markets
 Reducing transaction costs by enhancing competition

Recent proposals

Roadmap for Regulatory Reform
In May 2017, the committee's “Roadmap for Regulatory Reform” set forth priority regulatory actions for the Trump administration that would promote U.S. economic growth and enhance the stability of the U.S. financial system. The Roadmap consisted of eleven recommendation areas:
 Conducting a cumulative assessment of regulatory impact
 Enhancing the U.S. approach to international regulatory frameworks
 Reexamining bank capital and liquidity requirements
 Reducing undue regulatory burdens on community banks and regional banks
 Simplifying and streamlining the Volcker Rule
 Ensuring that rulemakings are adopted through a transparent and public process
 Enhancing the process of identifying and addressing systemic risk
 Establishing a rule of law framework for the Federal Reserve as a lender of last resort
 Reinvigorating the stagnant U.S. IPO market
 Reforming trading rules for the U.S. stock market
 Reviewing the U.S. public enforcement regime

Rationalizing Enforcement in the U.S. Financial System
In June 2018, the staff of the Committee developed a comprehensive overview of the structure, operation, and transparency of the U.S. public enforcement system as it pertains to the financial system. The staff set forth recommendations in four major areas:
 Improving coordination and cooperation between enforcement authorities
 Rationalizing the setting of sanctions in enforcement actions
 Ensuring the appropriate use of monetary sanctions
 Promoting individual accountability

Expanding Opportunities for Investors and Retirees: Private Equity
In October 2018, the Committee found that private equity funds have a well-established performance history that justifies expanding access to them. It recommends three ways to do so:
 Legislative reforms to expand access to direct investments in private equity funds
 SEC reforms to expand access to public closed-end funds that invest in private equity funds
 Department of Labor reforms to facilitate the ability of 401(k) plans to offer investment options that provide exposure to private equity funds.

Committee members

Gregory Babyak, global head of regulatory and policy group, Bloomberg
Kenneth Bentsen, Jr., president & CEO, Securities Industry and Financial Markets Association
Andrew Berry, managing director, head of regulatory strategy and initiatives, Americas, UBS
Jeffrey Brown, senior vice president legislative and regulatory affairs, Charles Schwab
Roel C. Campos, partner, Hughes, Hubbard & Reed; former commissioner, Securities and Exchange Commission
Jason Carroll, managing director, Hudson River Trading
Douglas Cifu, CEO, Virtu Financial
Allen Ferrell, Harvey Greenfield Professor of Securities Law, Harvard Law School
John Finley, senior managing director and chief legal officer, The Blackstone Group
Benjamin M. Friedman, William Joseph Maier Professor of Political Economy, Harvard University
Kenneth A. Froot, André Jakurski Professor of Business Administration, Emeritus, Harvard University Graduate School of Business
Adam Gilbert, PwC financial services advisory risk & regulatory co-leader, PricewaterhouseCoopers
Robert R. Glauber, adjunct lecturer, Harvard Kennedy School of Government; visiting professor, Harvard Law School; former chairman & CEO, NASD
Kenneth C. Griffin, president & CEO, Citadel Investment Group LLC
R. Glenn Hubbard, Dean & Russell L. Carson Professor of Finance and Economics, Columbia Business School; committee co-chair
Greg Jensen, co-chief investment officer, Bridgewater Associates
Wei Jiang, Arthur F. Burns Professor of Free and Competitive Enterprise & vice dean for curriculum and instruction dean's office, Columbia Business School
Steven A. Kandarian, chairman, president & CEO, MetLife
Michael Koh, head of regulatory strategy & policy, BNP Paribas
Andrew Kurtizkes, executive vice president & chief risk officer, State Street Corporation
Craig Lazzara, managing director and global head of index investment strategy, S&P Dow Jones Indices
Theo Lubke, chief regulatory reform officer, Securities Division, Goldman Sachs
Andrei Magasiner, corporate treasurer, Bank of America
Michael Mendelson, principal, AQR
Barbara G. Novick, vice chairman, BlackRock
Sandra E. O'Connor, managing director, chief regulatory affairs officer, J.P. Morgan Chase
Craig Phillips, former counselor to the secretary, United States Department of the Treasury
Robert C. Pozen, senior lecturer, MIT Sloan School of Management
Nancy Prior, president, Fixed Income Division, Fidelity Investments
David Rubenstein, co-founder & co-executive chairman, The Carlyle Group
Hal S. Scott, Nomura Professor and president of Program on International Financial Systems, Harvard Law School; Committee President
John Shrewsberry, CFO, Wells Fargo
Leslie N. Silverman, senior counsel, Cleary Gottlieb Steen & Hamilton LLP; committee legal advisor
Debra Stone, managing director, head of corporate regulatory affairs J.P. Morgan Chase
Makoto Takashima, president and CEO, Sumitomo Mitsui Banking Corporation
John L. Thornton, chairman, The Brookings Institution; committee co-chair
Joseph Ucuzoglu, CEO, Deloitte
Yuqiang Xiao, chairman of ICBC US Management Committee, general manager of ICBC New York Branch, Industrial and Commercial Bank of China
Michael Zarcone, head of corporate affairs and chief of staff to the chairman and CEO, Metlife

External links 
Committee on Capital Markets Regulation

References

Business organizations based in the United States
Financial markets
Financial regulation in the United States
Financial regulation
Charities based in Massachusetts